Alexander 'Sandy' Houston (born c. 1894, date of death unknown) was a Canadian international lawn bowler.

Houston was born in Torbanlea, Australia before moving to Scotland in 1902 and then Canada in 1922. He competed in the first World Bowls Championship in Kyeemagh, New South Wales, Australia in 1966  and won a silver medal in the triples with Karl Beacom and John Henderson at the event.

References

1890s births
Year of death missing
Canadian male bowls players
Bowls players at the 1958 British Empire and Commonwealth Games
Commonwealth Games competitors for Canada